"Stuck" is a song by American DJ duo Lost Kings from their third extended play (EP) Paper Crowns (2019). It features vocals from Swedish singer Tove Styrke. The song was written by Caroline Pennell, Mick Coogan, Nicki Adamsson, Norris Shanholtz, and Robert Abisi, and produced by Lost Kings and Adamsson. "Stuck" was released as a single on July 19, 2018, through Disruptor and RCA.

Chart performance
In Sweden, "Stuck" debuted at number 56 on the Sverigetopplistan singles chart on July 27, 2018, which became its peak position. The song spent a total of two weeks on the chart.

Music video
The music video for "Stuck" was directed by Tyler Bailey.

Track listing
Digital single
 "Stuck" – 3:12

Remix single
 "Stuck" (Kuur x Kbubs x DCB remix) – 3:44
 "Stuck" (Gil Glaze remix) – 3:07
 "Stuck" (Julius C remix) – 3:12

Credits and personnel
Credits are adapted from Tidal.

Caroline Pennellsongwriting
Mick Coogansongwriting
Nicki Adamssonsongwriting, production
Norris Shanholtzsongwriting, recording
Robert Abisisongwriting
Lost Kingsproduction
Tove Styrkevocals
Mitch McCarthymixing
Tatsuya Satomastering

Charts

Release history

References

2018 songs
2018 singles
Tove Styrke songs
Songs written by Caroline Pennell
Disruptor Records singles
RCA Records singles